KWHI is a radio station airing a Full Service format licensed to Brenham, Texas, broadcasting on 1280 kHz AM. The station is owned by Tom S. Whitehead, Inc.

References

External links

Radio stations established in 1947
WHI
1947 establishments in Texas